Earl Fitzwilliam (or FitzWilliam) was a title in both the Peerage of Ireland and the Peerage of Great Britain held by the head of the Fitzwilliam family (later Wentworth-Fitzwilliam).

History
The Fitzwilliams acquired extensive holdings in the south of the West Riding of Yorkshire, largely through strategic marital alliances. In 1410, Sir John Fitzwilliam of Sprotborough, who died in 1421, married Margaret Clarell, daughter of Thomas Clarell of Aldwark, the descendant of a major Norman landholding family. This is how the Fitzwilliams acquired the Clarell holdings.

Sir William Fitzwilliam (–1534) was an Alderman and Sheriff of London and acquired the Milton Hall estate in Peterborough in 1502. His grandson Sir William Fitzwilliam served as Lord Deputy of Ireland from 1571 to 1575 and from 1588 to 1594; he supervised the execution of the death sentence on Mary, Queen of Scots.

Barons Fitzwilliam
His grandson William Fitzwilliam (d. 1643) was raised to the Peerage of Ireland as Lord Fitzwilliam, Baron of Liffer, alias Lifford, in the County of Donegal, in 1620. He was the first Baron FitzWilliam.

His son was William FitzWilliam, 2nd Baron FitzWilliam (c.1609 – 21 February 1658).

His son William became 3rd Baron FitzWilliam.

Earls Fitzwilliam

The 3rd Baron FitzWilliam succeeded his father in 1658, and in 1716 was created the first Earl Fitzwilliam, of the County of Tyrone with the subsidiary title Viscount Milton, in the County of Westmeath, also in the Peerage of Ireland. The eldest son of the Earl Fitzwilliam bore the courtesy title Viscount Milton. He was succeeded by his son, the second Earl.

The second Earl, John Fitzwilliam, sat as Member of Parliament for Peterborough. On his death, the titles passed to his son, the third Earl.

The third Earl, William Fitzwilliam, also represented Peterborough in the House of Commons. In April 1742 he was created Lord Fitzwilliam, Baron of Milton in the County of Northampton, in the Peerage of Great Britain, and in 1746 he was further honoured when he was made Earl Fitzwilliam, of Norborough with the subsidiary title Viscount Milton, both in the County of Northampton, also in the Peerage of Great Britain. Lord Fitzwilliam married Lady Anne Watson-Wentworth (died 1769), daughter of Thomas Watson-Wentworth, 1st Marquess of Rockingham, and sister of Charles Watson-Wentworth, 2nd Marquess of Rockingham. He was succeeded by his son, the fourth Earl.

The fourth Earl, William Fitzwilliam, was a prominent Whig politician and served as Lord President of the Council and as Lord-Lieutenant of Ireland. In 1782 he inherited the Watson-Wentworth estates (including Wentworth Woodhouse) on the death of his uncle Lord Rockingham, which made him one of the greatest landowners in the country. When he died the titles passed to his son, the fifth Earl.

The fifth Earl, Charles Wentworth-Fitzwilliam, represented several constituencies in the House of Commons and was made a Knight of the Garter in 1851. In 1856 Lord Fitzwilliam assumed by Royal licence the additional surname of Wentworth. He was succeeded by his second but eldest surviving son, the sixth Earl.

The sixth Earl was William Wentworth-Fitzwilliam. He sat as Member of Parliament for Malton and County Wicklow and served as Lord Lieutenant of the West Riding of Yorkshire. His eldest son William FitzWilliam, Viscount Milton, was also a member of parliament but predeceased his father. Lord Fitzwilliam was therefore succeeded by his grandson, the seventh Earl.  Also, Lady Mabel Fitzwilliam, a socialist politician and "an ardent pioneer in education and social welfare", was a granddaughter of the 6th Earl.

The seventh Earl was William Wentworth-Fitzwilliam (25 July 1872 – 15 February 1943), the eldest son of Viscount Milton (William Wentworth Fitzwilliam). He represented Wakefield in Parliament as a Liberal Unionist. When he died the titles passed to his son, the eighth Earl.

The eighth Earl was Peter Wentworth-Fitzwilliam (31 December 1910 – 13 May 1948). He was killed in an air crash in France. On his early death the line of the eldest son of the sixth Earl failed and titles passed to the late Earl's first cousin once removed, the ninth Earl.

The ninth Earl was Eric Spencer Wentworth-Fitzwilliam (4 December 1883 – 3 April 1952). He was the son of Captain the Hon. Sir William Charles Wentworth-Fitzwilliam, fourth son of the sixth Earl. When he died in 1952 this line of the family also failed and the titles were inherited by his second cousin, the tenth Earl.

The tenth Earl was William Thomas George Wentworth-Fitzwilliam (28 May 1904 – 21 September 1979). He was the son of George Charles Wentworth-Fitzwilliam, son of the Hon. George Wentworth-FitzWilliam, MP, third son of the fifth Earl. He and his wife had no children.

After extinction
On the death of the tenth Earl, all the titles became extinct. The family seat of Wentworth Woodhouse was sold while the more than 80,000-acre (320 km²) estate including much of the town of Malton, North Yorkshire, was retained. The other family seat, Milton Hall, and its considerable estate of over 50,000 acres (200 km²) together with valuable properties in Peterborough and the surrounding area continue by descent in the family.

The Bourne Park Estate, near Canterbury, Kent, England, remains in the ownership of Lady Juliet Tadgell, née Wentworth-Fitzwilliam, the only child of the 8th Earl by his wife the former Olive Dorothea Plunket.

List of the Barons Fitzwilliam (1620)
William Fitzwilliam, 1st Baron Fitzwilliam (died 1644)
William Fitzwilliam, 2nd Baron Fitzwilliam (–1658)
William Fitzwilliam, 3rd Baron Fitzwilliam (1643–1719) (created Earl Fitzwilliam in 1716)

List of the Earls Fitzwilliam (1716; 1746)
William Fitzwilliam, 1st Earl Fitzwilliam (1643–1719)
John Fitzwilliam, 2nd Earl Fitzwilliam (1681–1728)
William Fitzwilliam, 3rd Earl Fitzwilliam (1719–1756) (created Earl Fitzwilliam in the Peerage of Great Britain in 1746)
William Fitzwilliam, 4th Earl Fitzwilliam (1748–1833)
Charles William Wentworth-Fitzwilliam, 5th Earl Fitzwilliam (1786–1857)
William Charles Wentworth-FitzWilliam, Viscount Milton (1812–1835)
William Thomas Spencer Wentworth-Fitzwilliam, 6th Earl Fitzwilliam (1815–1902)
William Wentworth-FitzWilliam, Viscount Milton (1839–1877)
William Charles de Meuron Wentworth-Fitzwilliam, 7th Earl Fitzwilliam (1872–1943)
(William Henry Lawrence) Peter Wentworth-Fitzwilliam, 8th Earl Fitzwilliam (1910–1948)
Eric Spencer Wentworth-Fitzwilliam, 9th Earl Fitzwilliam (1883–1952)
William Thomas George Wentworth-Fitzwilliam, 10th Earl Fitzwilliam (1904–1979)

See also
Marquess of Rockingham
Earl Fitzwilliam's private railway
Viscount FitzWilliam, peerage of Ireland, an unrelated family.

References

Sources

Extinct earldoms in the Peerage of Ireland
People from Peterborough
Extinct earldoms in the Peerage of Great Britain
Noble titles created in 1716
Noble titles created in 1746
FitzWilliam family